Monaco competed at the 2013 Mediterranean Games in Mersin, Turkey from the 20th to 30 June 2013.

Cycling

Sailing 

Men

Taekwondo

References

Nations at the 2013 Mediterranean Games
2013
Mediterranean Games